Loopt was a company based in Mountain View, California, United States which provided a service for smartphone users to share their location selectively with other people (see location-based service). The service supported iPhone, BlackBerry, Android and Windows Phones. Loopt's services had more than five million registered users and partnerships with every major U.S. mobile phone carrier. Their applications offered a variety of privacy controls. In addition to its core features, users also had the ability to integrate Loopt with other social networks, including Facebook and Twitter.

The company was founded in 2005 and received initial funding from Y Combinator, and completed Series A and B financing led by Sequoia Capital and New Enterprise Associates. The company's board members included TiVo-founder Mike Ramsay and Greg McAdoo of Sequoia Capital. In March 2012 Loopt agreed to be acquired by Green Dot Corporation for $43.4 million in cash, with $9.8 million of that to be set aside for employee retention.

History
Loopt began with seed funding from Y Combinator. That summer, Stanford sophomores Sam Altman and Nick Sivo worked to build the first prototype of Loopt. They were later joined by Alok Deshpande as well as two of Sam's childhood friends, Rick & Tom Pernikoff.

Loopt received US$5 million in Series A funding from Sequoia Capital and New Enterprise Associates and struck a deal to launch the service on Boost Mobile devices in September 2006. Boost Mobile featured Loopt in a series of commercials that are most known for the "Where you at?" tag line.

In August 2007, Loopt expanded the service to select Sprint phones, and in June 2008, to Verizon. Loopt announced support for most GPS-enabled Blackberries on June 13, 2008. Loopt received US$8.25 million in Series B funding in July 2007.

In February 2008, Loopt and CBS did a deal to deliver location based advertising. Seven months later, Loopt released an opt-in feature in Loopt's iPhone application, called Loopt Mix, which uses location-based services to enable iPhone users to find and meet new people nearby.

At Apple's Worldwide Developers Conference in June 2008, Altman presented the Loopt application for the iPhone. Loopt for the iPhone became available to US customers of the Apple iTunes App Store on July 11, 2008. The application is not yet available in other countries.

In the summer of 2008, Loopt sponsored Black20.com's The Middle Show with host Dave Price.

In October 2008, Loopt was sued by Earthcomber for patent infringement. The case was dropped by Earthcomber in March 2009.

In February 2009, Loopt expanded service again to select AT&T phones, making it the first service since SMS available across all major networks.

In October 2009, Loopt acquired Y Combinator-backed startup GraffitiGeo for an undisclosed sum.

In March 2010, Loopt launched an upgraded version of its iPhone app, incorporating place and event information to its Pulse database, bringing in content from ZVents, Metromix, and SonicLiving.  These are added to existing content partnerships with Citysearch, Zagat, and Bing.

In March 2010, Loopt launched a product called Loopt Pulse, exclusively designed for the iPad.

In April 2010, Loopt launched an upgraded version of its BlackBerry app. The upgraded version includes the same places and events upgrade formerly launched in March 2010 for iPhone users.

In December 2010, Loopt launched Loopt version 4.0, which featured a completely updated design.

In March 2012, after raising more than $30M in venture capital, Loopt announced it had agreed to be acquihired by Green Dot Corporation for US$43.4 million.

Products and services
Loopt's geosocial networking services, similar to the likes of whrrl, buzzd, and brightkite, show users where friends are located and what they are doing via maps on their mobile phones. It is available on select devices across Sprint/Nextel, AT&T, Boost Mobile, Verizon, and MetroPCS, as well as the iPhone, Android and BlackBerry.

Mobile application — the Loopt software provides real-time location updating (with the exception of the iPhone until OS4.0 ships - see below). Users can update location and status and share with friends. Loopt is currently supported on over 100 different phones across all major carriers.

In April 2010, Apple announced iOS 4.0, which allowed background real-time location updating on Loopt iPhone app. Loopt had indicated they would support this as soon as Apple ships iOS 4.0 for the iPhone ships in summer 2010.

Loopt for iPhone and Android — This is Loopt's core application—the most updated and versatile. It can help find friends, discover places, and get rewards/deals.
Website — Loopt provides a web portal which is synchronized with the mobile version of the service.
Facebook application — This was developed in 2008 for users to share location with friends in the Facebook network.
Twitter and Facebook integration — Status updates with a location link can be sent via Loopt to a user's Twitter status or Facebook status.
Loopt Star — This mobile game rewards people for often checking into certain places. In late 2010, all related functions were moved into the core Loopt app for iPhone and Android. Accordingly, Loopt Star was removed from the iOS App Store and Android Market.

Privacy
Loopt was permission-based and users shared location information only with their selected friends, networks, and services. Loopt users could turn location-sharing on or off at any time on a friend-by-friend basis or for all friends at once.

Loopt worked regularly with select organizations that focus on privacy and security including: The Family Online Safety Institute (board member); ConnectSafely.org; Ponemon Institute; Electronic Frontier Foundation; National Network to End Domestic Violence; Progress & Freedom Foundation's Center for Digital Media Freedom; Internet Education Foundation; and Cyber Safe California by the California Office of Privacy Protection (member, advisory committee). Loopt sat on the CTIA's WIC Leadership Council and was an active participant in the creation of the CTIA LBS Best Practices.

More details are on Loopt's privacy pages.

SMS invitation issues
Users of Loopt must register their mobile phone number, full name, and date of birth. Loopt's privacy notice states that users can control who receives geo-location information via privacy settings.

When Loopt released its native iPhone application on July 10, 2008, the software quickly gained notoriety for sending Short Message Service (SMS) invites to users' address books without, it seemed, the user's knowledge. More upsetting, the SMS service failed to respond to the industry required STOP message. Merlin Mann complained, "I'm getting SMSs from Loopt users asking me to be their friend or whatever. I never asked for this. SMSs cost money."

On July 14, 2008, Loopt posted to its blog that the mass invites could be attributed to a confusing user interface, and they are working on an improved invitation flow. The comments, however, point out they continue to ignore STOP messages (a command that automated text-message services use which is supposed to allow people to control whether they receive messages). Respect for STOP was announced July 15, 2008, and on July 17, 2008, Loopt released an updated version which addressed the issues with the confusing user interface.

See also
 Location awareness

Notes

References

External links 

Y Combinator companies
Android (operating system) software
BlackBerry software
IOS software
Mobile social software
Geosocial networking
Customer loyalty programs
Software companies established in 2005
Software companies disestablished in 2012
2012 disestablishments in California
2012 mergers and acquisitions